Anand Jain (born 1957) is an Indian business executive. He is the Chairman of Jai Corp Limited, Urban Infrastructure Venture Capital Limited. He has 30 years of experience in various businesses, with an expertise in real estate, finance and capital markets and often considered as third son of Dhirubhai Ambani

Anand Jain was No. 11 on the Forbes India's 40 Richest list in 2007. His son, Harsh Jain, is the co-founder and CEO of Indian fantasy sports company Dream11.

Business career

According to an article published in The Economic Times in 2005, Anand Jain was first noted in Reliance in the mid-1980s, when he crushed the bear cartel led by Manu Manek, the then kingpin of Bombay Stock Exchange. Later, he emerged as a key figure in the running of the day-to-day operations of the Reliance group, particularly its telecom venture Reliance Infocomm. In January 2005, Anil Ambani (brother of Mukesh Ambani) resigned as vice-chairman and director of IPCL, citing his differences with Anand Jain. In June 2005, media reported that Jain would step down from the IPCL board, after a settlement was announced between the two Ambani brothers. However, in July 2005, it was reported that he has stayed on the IPCL board.

Anand Jain has been closely associated with the Fortune 500 Reliance Group for over 25 years. He served as the vice-chairman of Reliance Capital and also on the Reliance group company Indian Petro Chemicals Ltd. (IPCL).

Anand Jain served on board of trustees of Mumbai Port Trust twice for two years each, and also on the Jawaharlal Nehru Port from April 1994 to March 1995. He is also a Director of the Rewas Port Limited, which is a Greenfield, mega scale port development project near Mumbai. The port would also serve as a primary gateway for the twin mega SEZs coming up in its vicinity: Viz; NMSEZ and MSEZ. The port in its first 5 yrs of operation aims to handle more than 50 Million tonnes of cargo.
He has also promoted India's largest Real Estate private equity fund having raised over Rs. 32.86 billion from retail and institutional investors. He is an adviser to the Urban Infrastructure Real Estate Fund, which has raised US$500 Million from international investors and along with the local participation of US$60 Million, the total fund size is US$560 Million.

Anand Jain is also the Chairman of Urban Infrastructure Venture Capital Limited which manages Urban Infrastructure Venture Capital Fund. He is also a director of the following ventures

Presently a senior executive with the Reliance Group, Anand Jain is leading a team of professionals to make the first greenfield Special Economic Zone (SEZ) at Mumbai a reality. He has been a promoter of large SEZs in India with a vision to create a globally competitive business environment.

Anand Jain is a member of the Managing Council of Sir H. N. Reliance Foundation Hospital and Research Centre. He has been appointed by the Government of Maharashtra as a member of the "Empowered Committee for Transformation of Mumbai into a World Class City." He is also a member of the "Citizens Action Group" dedicated to bring Mumbai on the international map.

References

Businesspeople from Mumbai
Living people
1957 births
Reliance Industries people
Indian billionaires
Hill Grange High School alumni